Coleophora capricornis is a moth of the family Coleophoridae. It is found in Namibia.

References

capricornis
Moths described in 2004
Moths of Africa